USS Thomas A. Edison (SSBN-610), an  nuclear-powered ballistic missile submarine, was the second ship of the United States Navy to be named for the inventor, Thomas Edison (1847–1931).

Construction and commissioning

Thomas A. Edisons keel was laid down on 15 March 1960 by the Electric Boat Division of the General Dynamics Corporation of Groton, Connecticut.  She was launched on 15 June 1961, sponsored by Mrs. Madeleine Edison Sloane, daughter of Thomas Edison and Mina Miller and wife of John Eyre Sloane, and commissioned on 10 March 1962 with Captain Charles M. Young commanding the Blue Crew and Captain Walter Dedrick commanding the Gold Crew.

Service history
On 9 April 1962, during shakedown training off the eastern coast of the United States, Thomas A. Edison collided with the destroyer .

Thomas A. Edison loaded sixteen Polaris A2 missiles, which had a range of a range of 1500 nm (1725 miles) and carried a single nuclear warhead on each missile, at the naval base in Charleston, South Carolina, and embarked upon her first deterrent patrol on November 7, 1962. She was part of the eight United States nuclear-powered ballistic missile submarines which participated in the Cuban Missile Crisis as part of the United States nuclear order of battle from October to November 1962. During Edison's load out in Charleston at 1900 on October 22, 1962, DEFCON 3 was ordered for the Poliaris submarines on patrol. At DEFCON 3, “Polaris submarines moved to their launch points.” She concluded that patrol at the base at Holy Loch, Scotland, from which she operated for the next four years and conducted 17 deterrent patrols. In September 1966, her official home port was changed from New London, Connecticut, to Charleston, South Carolina, in preparation for her first major overhaul. She ended her 17th patrol at Charleston on 15 October 1966 and began her overhaul on 28 October 1966. She completed repairs on 9 May 1968; and, after post-overhaul sea trials and shakedown, she embarked upon her 18th deterrent patrol on 22 September 1968.

After a shortened 19th patrol, she conducted a "Follow on Target" (FOT) test launch. For this test, four missiles were selected at random, their warheads were removed, and telemetry packages were fitted in place of the warheads. Thomas A. Edison then proceeded to a location just off the Canary Islands and fired these missiles into the Caribbean. Due to the accuracy and timeliness of these successful launches, the members of that Blue Crew were awarded a Meritorious Unit Citation.

Through June 1973, Thomas A. Edison operated out of New London and Rota, Spain, from which ports she conducted another 19 deterrent patrols in the Mediterranean Sea.

In June 1973, she was transferred to the United States Pacific Fleet, arriving in San Diego, on 11 July 1973. After a short period of operations with Submarine Group 5, she moved to Vallejo, California, on 6 August 1973 to begin another overhaul, this time at the Mare Island Naval Shipyard at Vallejo, California. On 30 November 1974, she completed repairs and, following shakedown in January and February 1975, she transited the Panama Canal again in March 1975 to fire test missiles near Cape Canaveral, Florida. She concluded that mission in July and retransited the Canal on 8 August 1975.  Thomas A. Edison carried out operations along the United States West Coast until December 1975, at which time she headed for her new home port, Apra, Guam.

On 6 October 1980, Thomas A. Edison completed her final deterrent patrol and was reclassified an attack submarine, given hull number SSN-610.  Thomas A. Edisons missile section was deactivated. Concrete blocks were placed in the missile tubes, and the missile fire-control system and one of the ship's inertial navigation systems were removed. 

Decommissioned on 1 December 1983, Thomas A. Edison was struck from the Naval Vessel Register on 30 April 1986. She went through the Navy's Nuclear Powered Ship and Submarine Recycling Program at Puget Sound Naval Shipyard, Bremerton, Washington, beginning on 1 October 1996 and on 1 December 1997 ceased to exist as the recycling was completed.

Elevator

Thomas A. Edison was the first and only submarine to have an elevator. In 1962, an elevator was added to Thomas A. Edison so that President Kennedy could access the submarine. President Kennedy had a back injury which prevented him from using vertical ladders. The addition was known as the JFK Submarine Access Elevator and allowed the President to enter the submarine through one of its deck hatches while standing. On April 13, 1962, President Kennedy and his naval aide to the president, Captain Tazewell Shepard, Jr., toured the recently commissioned submarine while it was at the naval base in Norfolk, Virginia. As of February 2022, the elevator is located at the  Museum along the Thames River in Groton, Connecticut.

Steinway piano 

During the construction of Thomas A. Edison, the commissioning captain, Charles M. "Cy" Young, purchased a Steinway piano that was placed aboard before the hull was sealed. This piano remained on board the submarine for 22 years (1961–1983) up until her decommissioning. The Steinway piano is the only example of a full-sized piano ever installed on a U.S. submarine conducting nuclear deterrent patrols.

Notes

References 

Ships built in Groton, Connecticut
Ethan Allen-class submarines
Cold War submarines of the United States
Nuclear submarines of the United States Navy
United States submarine accidents
Maritime incidents in 1962
1961 ships